Céline Ferer (born 21 June 1991) is a French rugby union player. She plays for the France women's national rugby union team and Stade Toulousain.

Career
Ferer had been the captain at Aviron Bayonnais prior to joining Stade Toulousain in 2019. After 9 years with Bayonne she initially turned down the advances from Toulouse but didn’t feel she could turn them down a second time with new opportunities on offer.

She was named in France's team for the delayed 2021 Rugby World Cup in New Zealand.  She was named as captain for the French side for their opening match against South Africa in the World Cup.

References

1991 births
Living people
French female rugby union players